Slippin' In is the ninth studio album by Buddy Guy, released in 1994 through Silvertone Records. The album earned Guy the Grammy Award for Best Contemporary Blues Album.

Track listing

Musicians
 Buddy Guy - Lead Guitar, Vocals
 David Grissom - Guitar (tracks: 1, 2, 4, 11), Acoustic Guitar on 8, Slide Guitar on 9
   Scott Holt - Guitar (tracks: 3, 5 to 7, 10)
 Reese Wynans - Piano & Organ (tracks: 1, 2, 4, 7 to 9, 11)
 Johnnie Johnson (musician) - Piano
 Tommy Shannon - Bass  (tracks: 1, 2, 4, 8, 9, 11)
 Greg Rzab - Bass
 Chris Layton - Drums (tracks: 1, 2, 4, 8, 9, 11)
 Ray Allison (musician) - Drums
 "Slippin' Out" Singers - Suzanne Maso, Emily Maso, Monica Maso, Carey Reisz, Anne Markovich, Kelley Flynn, Hillary Faeta, Brian Moravec, Bill Potocki, "Crazy" Dave Komie, L. Daniel Roman, Rob "Skoalie O" Davis, Buffy Holt, Davin Reddington, JC Clements, Jason Blankenship, Annette McKeee, Frank Blinkal, Mike Homberger, Garrett Mudd, Buddy Guy Band, "Blind Willie" Lambchop and Lily Angela Maso

References

1994 albums
Buddy Guy albums
Albums produced by Eddie Kramer
Grammy Award for Best Contemporary Blues Album